Lee's Chapel Church and Masonic Hall is a historic Masonic building in rural northern Independence County, Arkansas, US. It is a two-story gable-roofed structure, built out of concrete blocks resting on a poured concrete foundation. The roof is shingled, and topped by a small belfry. It was built in 1946 as a joint project of the Lee's Chapel Methodist Church and Montgomery Lodge No. 360. The lodge subsequently moved to Cave City.

The building was listed on the National Register of Historic Places in 2001.  It is distinctive as the only known concrete-block church in the northwestern part of the county.

See also
National Register of Historic Places listings in Independence County, Arkansas

References

Masonic buildings completed in 1946
20th-century churches in the United States
Churches on the National Register of Historic Places in Arkansas
Masonic buildings in Arkansas
Clubhouses on the National Register of Historic Places in Arkansas
1946 establishments in Arkansas
National Register of Historic Places in Independence County, Arkansas
Churches completed in 1946
Concrete buildings and structures